The 2000 Supertaça Cândido de Oliveira was the 22nd edition of the Supertaça Cândido de Oliveira, the annual Portuguese football season-opening match contested by the winners of the previous season's top league and cup competitions (or cup runner-up in case the league- and cup-winning club is the same). The 2000 Supertaça Cândido de Oliveira was contested over two legs, and opposed Porto and Sporting CP of the Primeira Liga. Porto qualified for the SuperCup by winning the 1999–2000 Taça de Portugal, whilst Sporting CP qualified for the Supertaça by winning the 1999–2000 Primeira Liga.

The first leg which took place at the Estádio das Antas, saw 1–1 scoreline. The second leg which took place at the Estádio José Alvalade finished goalless (1–1 on aggregate), which led to the Supertaça being replayed in May 2001. The replay which took place at the Estádio Municipal de Coimbra, saw the Leões defeat the Dragões 1–0 thanks to Alberto Acosta goal which would claim the Leões a fourth Supertaça.

First leg

Details

Second leg

Details

Replay

Details

References

Supertaça Cândido de Oliveira
2000–01 in Portuguese football
FC Porto matches
Sporting CP matches